This article describes the group stage of the 2015–16 LEN Champions League.

Format
12 teams were drawn into two groups of six teams, where they play each other twice. The top fthree teams will advance to the final six.

Groups
The matchdays are 28 October, 11 November, 28 November, 16 December 2015 and 3 February, 10 February, 12 March, 16 April, 30 April and 18 May 2016.

Group A

Group B

External links
Official website

2015–16 LEN Champions League